WeCU Technologies (as in "we see you") is a technology company based in Israel that is developing a "mind reading" technology. The company's products evaluate reactions to specific images for indications that someone is a potential threat.

The technology involves projecting an image that only a terrorist would be likely to recognize onto a screen. The idea is that people always react when they see a familiar image in an unexpected location. For example, if a person unexpectedly saw an image of their own mother on the screen, their face and body would react. For the terrorist detection, the people passing by the screen would be monitored partly by humans, but mostly by hidden cameras or sensors that are capable of detecting slight increases in body temperature and heart rate. Other detection devices, which are more sensitive and currently under development, could be added later.

The bank of images used for projection is varied and unpredictable, as is the location where the images will appear, so even trained suspects who are aware of the system can still be detected.

The company's CEO is Ehud Givon.

References

Information technology companies of Israel